Poliobotys is a monotypic moth genus of the family Crambidae described by Jay C. Shaffer and Eugene G. Munroe in 2007. Its single species, Poliobotys ablactalis, was described by Francis Walker in 1859. It occurs throughout South-east Asia, including Réunion, Australia, Hong Kong and Africa (Kenya, Senegal, South Africa).

Subspecies
 Poliobotys ablactalis ablactalis
 Poliobotys ablactalis borbonica (Guillermet, 2008) (Réunion)

References

External links
 "Poliobotys ablactalis (Walker, 1859)". African Moths. Retrieved March 3, 2018.

Monotypic moth genera
Spilomelinae
Crambidae genera
Moths of Africa
Moths of Réunion